Agriculture in Rivers State is an important branch of the economy of Rivers State, Nigeria. It is the main source of livelihood for the rural people. Agriculture creates employment, provides income and helps curb out-migration. The industry in the state is overseen by the Rivers State Ministry of Agriculture.

History
Prior to the discovery of oil in commercial quantity in 1951, agriculture was the primary occupation of the people of Rivers State. Around 19th century when the industrial revolution reached its peak in England, the area was then referred to as Oil Rivers Protectorate, this was due to its abundant palm oil and kernel which basically constituted the main revenue source of the country. In a sample survey carried out by the Federal Ministry of Agriculture and Natural Resources, about 40% of the rural inhabitants were committed to farming in 1983.

Crops
Rivers State is one of the leading states in the production of yam, cassava, cocoyam, maize, rice and beans. About 39% (760,000 hectares) of the state's total land mass, particularly in the upland area, is suitable for cultivation. Major cash crops produced are oil palm products, rubber, coconut, raffia palm and jute. Other crops grown for food include, vegetables, melon, pineapples, mango, pepper, banana and plantain.

Fishing
The fishing industry is a thriving sector in Rivers State. Besides being lucrative, fishing is also a favorite pastime activity. There are approximately 270 species of fish existing; with many artisanal fishermen in the riverine areas. The state provides valuable seafoods such as crabs, oysters, shrimps and sea snails among others.

Songhai Rivers Initiative Farm
The Songhai Rivers Initiative Farm (SRIF) combines livestock, aquaculture and agro-tourism. The centre serves as a place of excellence for training, production, research, demonstration as well as development of sustainable agricultural practices. SRIF was set up in partnership with Songhai International Centre Porto Novo. The project is located on a 314 hectare of farm land at Bunu in Tai local government area.

There are different units through which the SRIF executes its functions. These units include:

Administrative and hospitality centre
Technology and industrial park
Production
Cow and goat ranch
Concrete fish ponds
Earthen pond
Fish hatchery
Artificial lake
Green house and maggottery.

Other units are broilers production, cassava processing unit, feed mill, rice mill, machines production, stabilised bricks production, free range poultry, plantain farm, pineapple, vegetable garden, cassava and moringa cultivation units. More units designed for future production at the centre include coconut, animal feeds, mango for chips and juice, orange for juice and input for animal processing and snail production.

See also
Rivers State Ministry of Agriculture
Rivers State Agricultural Development Programme

References